Rolando Vicente Botello Garibaldo (born 20 November 1991) is a Panamanian professional footballer who plays as midfielder for Liga Panameña de Fútbol side Tauro and the Panama national team.

International career
Botello  made his debut for the Panama national team in a 1-0 friendly loss to the United States on 26 January 2012.

Honours
Tauro
Liga Panameña de Fútbol: 2010–11 Clausura, 2011–12 Clausura, 2013–14 Apertura, 2016–17 Clausura, 2018–19 Apertura, 2019 Apertura

References

External links

NFT Profile

1991 births
Living people
Sportspeople from Panama City
Panamanian footballers
Panama international footballers
Panama youth international footballers
Association football midfielders
Tauro F.C. players
Liga Panameña de Fútbol players